Luis Enrique Muñóz Medina (born July 21, 1988) is a Mexican-born footballer who plays for Puebla F.C. In 2007, he helped the club ascend to the first division.

See also
Football in Mexico
List of football clubs in Mexico

References

External links
 
 

Mexican footballers
1988 births
Living people
Association football defenders
Club Puebla players